Vitrina is genus of small air-breathing land snails, terrestrial pulmonate gastropod mollusks in the family Vitrinidae, the glass snails.

Species
Species with the genus Vitrina include:
 Vitrina angelicae Beck, 1837
 Vitrina josephinae Emberton & Griffiths, 2009 
 Vitrina madagascariensis E. A. Smith, 1882
 Vitrina marojeziana Fischer-Piette, Blanc, C.P., Blanc, F. & Salvat, 1994
 Vitrina pellucida (Müller, 1774)
 † Vitrina suevica Sandberger, 1872 
Taxa inquerenda
 Vitrina amoena Morelet, 1884 
 Vitrina angolensis Morelet, 1867 
 Vitrina bozasi de Rochebrune & Germain, 1904
 Vitrina compacta Preston, 1912 
 Vitrina ugandensis Thiele, 1911

References

 AnimalBase info at: 
  Bank, R. (2017). Classification of the Recent terrestrial Gastropoda of the World. Last update: July 16th, 2017

Vitrinidae